Marcel Deneux (born 16 August 1928) is a former member of the Senate of France. He represented the Somme department and is a member of the Union for French Democracy Party.

References
Page on the Senate website

1928 births
Possibly living people
French Senators of the Fifth Republic
Senators of Somme (department)